Marco Martino (born 21 February 1960) is an Italian former discus thrower. He won three medals, at senior level, at the International athletics competitions.

Biography
He competed in the 1984 Summer Olympics.

National titles
Marco Martino has won 14 times the individual national championship.
6 wins in discus throw at the Italian Athletics Championships (1983, 1986, 1987, 1988, 1990, 1991)
8 wins in discus throw at the Italian Winter Throwing Championships (1985, 1986, 1987, 1988, 1989, 1991, 1993, 1998)

See also
 Italian records in athletics
 Italian all-time top lists - Discus throw

References

External links
 

1960 births
Living people
Athletes from Rome
Italian male discus throwers
Olympic athletes of Italy
Athletes (track and field) at the 1984 Summer Olympics
Mediterranean Games gold medalists for Italy
Mediterranean Games silver medalists for Italy
Mediterranean Games bronze medalists for Italy
World Athletics Championships athletes for Italy
Athletes (track and field) at the 1983 Mediterranean Games
Athletes (track and field) at the 1987 Mediterranean Games
Athletes (track and field) at the 1991 Mediterranean Games
Mediterranean Games medalists in athletics
20th-century Italian people